Bar Chya Lee (Chinese: 黎拔佳; pinyin: Lí Bá Jiā; 27 December 1954 - 11 September 2019), known professionally as B.C. Lee, was a Taiwanese-Canadian actor and former politician who served on the Vancouver City Council from 2005 to 2008.

Life 
Lee was born in Macau and attended the English Primary School of Yuet Wah College. He began to learn how to read and write Chinese at the age of 12 after moving to Taiwan with his family. He studied at Ren-Ai Junior High School in Taipei and Chengcheng Junior High School in Tainan before attending National Tainan First Senior High School, and went on to obtain a bachelor’s degree and master’s degree in political science from National Chengchi University. In 1983, he moved to the United States to study at New York University (NYU) and obtained a master’s degree in public administration.

After graduation, he joined the New York City-based law firm Paul, Weiss as a compiler for their China Affairs Department. In 1991, he returned to work in Taiwan until he was dispatched in February 1992 by the Overseas Community Affairs Council to serve as the Secretary of Overseas Chinese Affairs in Western Canada at the Taipei Economic and Cultural Office in Canada’s Vancouver branch. He eventually moved to live in Vancouver permanently in 1994.

After moving to Vancouver, he engaged in marketing and public relations consulting for businesses. He participated in the establishment of East Meets West Productions and Fireglo Strategic Marketing Communications Inc., and was an active figure in the Greater Vancouver community. He was also the vice president of the Taiwan Chamber of Commerce in B.C. (then known as the Taiwan Entrepreneurs Investors Association in B.C.). From 1997 to 2000, he helped East Meets West Productions hold large-scale New Year’s Eve events in Vancouver and Toronto, and remained a key member when it won Annual Best Cultural Festival in the 1998 Canadian Event Awards, and Second Annual Best Festival and Third Annual Best Festival in 1999 and 2000, respectively.

In 2005, Lee was elected to the Vancouver City Council.

Lee was appointed as a board member of the BC Traditional Chinese Medicine and Acupuncture Administration by the British Columbia provincial government in 2012, and was subsequently elected to serve as vice chairman of the board until 2016.

Aside from politics, Lee also displayed a passion for community affairs, participating in and promoting many public welfare causes such as fundraising for the BC Children’s Hospital, and was an advocate for immigration.

Drawing on his academic background and practical experience in politics and public administration, Lee expressed unique and incisive views on public issues as a media commentator. He regularly authored columns for print media outlets, and both hosted and featured in digital current affairs programs such as Monday Forum on LS Times TV, for which he hosted 155 episodes between 2013 and 2019.

In 2012, Lee was awarded the Queen Elizabeth II Diamond Jubilee Medal for his long-term contributions to communication, cooperation, and mutual understanding between ethnic communities.

In addition to politics and public welfare, Lee had a passion for the performing arts. His roles spanned across theatre, television dramas, and movies, and he was nominated for Best Supporting Performance Male Dramatic Series in the 2017 Leo Awards.

Death 
On 11 September 2019, Lee died from liver cancer at Burnaby Hospital in British Columbia, Canada at the age of 64.

Political career 
In 2002, Lee was nominated by the Non-Partisan Association to run for the Vancouver City Council but was not elected. In 2005, he ran again and was elected, serving on the council from 2005 to 2008. At the time, he was the only fluent Mandarin speaker on the council.

In 2015, Lee was elected President of the Non-Partisan Association.

Acting credits

Film

Television

Theatre

References

External links 

 
 B.C. Lee hosting Monday Forum on LS Times TV

Vancouver city councillors
Non-Partisan Association councillors
1954 births
2019 deaths
Canadian people of Taiwanese descent
National Chengchi University alumni
New York University alumni
Canadian male film actors
Canadian actors of Asian descent
Canadian actor-politicians
Canadian male television actors
Canadian male stage actors